Mad Monster Party? is a 1967 American stop-motion animated musical comedy film produced by Rankin/Bass Productions for Embassy Pictures. The film stars the voices of Boris Karloff, Allen Swift, Gale Garnett, and Phyllis Diller. It tells the story of a mad scientist who achieves the secret of total destruction as he summons all the monsters to his island home to show it off while planning to retire as the head of the "Worldwide Organization of Monsters".

Although less well known than Rankin/Bass's holiday specials, it has become a cult film.

Plot
On the Isle of Evil, Baron Boris von Frankenstein (voiced by Boris Karloff) achieves his ultimate ambition, the secret of total destruction. Having perfected and tested the formula, he sends out messenger bats to summon all monsters to the Isle of Evil in the Caribbean Sea. The Baron intends to inform them of his discovery and also to reveal his imminent retirement as head of the Worldwide Organization of Monsters.

Besides Frankenstein's Monster (sometimes referred to as "Fang") and the Monster's more intelligent mate (voiced by Phyllis Diller) who live in the isle's castle with Boris, the invites also include Count Dracula, the Mummy, Quasimodo (referred to as "The Hunchback of Notre-Dame"), the Werewolf, The Invisible Man, Dr. Jekyll and Mr. Hyde, and the Creature from the Black Lagoon (referred to as just "The Creature").

The Baron's beautiful assistant Francesca (voiced by Gale Garnett) enters the lab to confirm that all invitations have been delivered and inquires about one of the addressees named Felix Flanken (voiced by Allen Swift impersonating James Stewart). Frankenstein explains that Flanken is his nephew and successor in the monster business. This displeases Francesca who covets the role for herself. Francesca even asks why there was not an invitation for "It". Boris replies that "It" was not invited since "It" can be a crushing bore, explaining that "It" even crushed the island's wild boars in his bare hands the last time "It" was invited.

Boris has his zombie butler Yetch (Swift impersonating Peter Lorre), Chef Mafia Machiavelli, and the zombie bellhops and servants make preparations for the upcoming party while having some zombies patrol the Isle of Evil to make sure that "It" does not show up uninvited. The monsters begin to arrive on the freighter that Felix is also traveling on. During dinner, Boris shows them the vial containing the formula of total destruction which he will demonstrate the next day while naming his successor in the Worldwide Organization of Monsters. Francesca secretly meets with Dracula to inform him about Felix.

When Felix proves to be an incompetent, asthmatic (and unsuitably kind-hearted) human when he meets up with his uncle, the monsters plot to eliminate him and gain control of the secret formula. Over time, Francesca develops feelings for Felix after he unknowingly saves her multiple times. As Dracula, Frankenstein's Monster, and the Monster's Mate descend upon Francesca, she sends out a letter (via messenger bat) to an unknown recipient. When the monsters corner Felix upon capturing Francesca, they are frightened at the arrival of "It" (revealed to be a giant gorilla and a take-off of King Kong) who proceeds to go on a rampage since he was not invited. "It" snatches up the monsters and Francesca (on whom "It" develops a crush).

Felix rushes off to tell his Uncle Boris what happened and is instructed to head to the boat. Boris leads the zombies in rescuing Francesca from "It" using biplanes. Boris convinces "It" to let Francesca go and to take him instead. "It" complies, releasing Francesca. Felix and Francesca manage to get off the island as Boris and the remainder of the monsters remain in the clutches of "It". Displeased that the monsters tried to steal the secret of total destruction for themselves and attempted to kill Felix as well as having to put up with "It", Boris sacrifices his life by dropping the vial containing the formula destroying the Isle of Evil and everything on it.

The destruction is witnessed offshore by Felix and Francesca. Francesca tearfully admits to Felix that she is not human, but is in fact a robot creation of Boris von Frankenstein. Felix answers that "none of us are perfect" (an in-joke reference to the closing line of the movie "Some Like It Hot"), mechanically repeating the last two words, indicating that he is also a robot creation of his uncle.

Cast
 Boris Karloff as Baron Boris von Frankenstein
 Alan Swift as Felix Flanken
 Swift also provided the voice of primary characters: Count Dracula, Frankenstein's Monster "Fang", the Werewolf, the Hunchback of Notre-Dame, the Invisible Man, Dr. Jekyll and Mr. Hyde, and "It", in addition to supporting characters: Yetch, a Skeleton, Chef Mafia Machiavelli, Mr. Kronkite, the Freighter Captain, the First Mate, and the Mailman.
 Gale Garnett as Francesca
 Phyllis Diller as The Monster's Mate
 Ethel Ennis as the Title Song Singer

Crew
 Directed by Jules Bass
 Produced by Arthur Rankin Jr.
 Executive producer – Joseph E. Levine
 Associate producer – Larry Roemer
 Screenplay by Len Korobkin, Harvey Kurtzman
 Story by Arthur Rankin Jr.
 Music and lyrics by Maury Laws, Jules Bass
 Characters designed by Jack Davis
 Continuity design – Don Duga
 "Animagic" technician – Tad Mochinaga
 Assistant director – Kizo Nagashima
 Choreography by "Killer Joe" Piro
 Music composed and scored by Maury Laws
 Sound engineers – Eric Tomlinson, Peter Page, Stephen Frohock

Production
The film was created using Rankin/Bass's "Animagic" stop-motion animation process, supervised by Tadahito Mochinaga at MOM Productions in Tokyo, Japan. The process involved photographing figurines a frame at a time, then re-positioning them, exposing another frame, and so forth. Known as stop-motion animation, it was the same approach used in RKO's King Kong, Art Clokey's Gumby and Davey and Goliath, and many other films, commercials and TV specials.

Classic monster films were enjoying a resurgence in popularity in the late 1960s, along with more comedy-centered examples, The Addams Family and The Munsters. This campy film is a spoof of horror themes, complete with musical numbers and inside jokes.

Mad Magazine creator Harvey Kurtzman penned the script (with writer Len Korobkin) and Mad artist Jack Davis designed many of the characters. Davis was a natural for the job, being famous both for his humor work and his monster stories in the pages of EC Comics. It has long been rumored that Forrest J. Ackerman had a hand in the script, but while the dialogue is rife with Famous Monsters of Filmland-like puns, Ackerman's involvement has never been confirmed and his name never appeared in the on-screen credits or in original promotion for the film at the time of its release. In fact, Rankin/Bass historian Rick Goldschmidt, in liner notes accompanying the Anchor Bay DVD release, denied Ackerman was ever involved, at the same time as the DVD packaging promoted Ackerman's name. Goldschmidt repeated his claims on this in a 2006 blog entry, based on his interviews with Korobkin, who claimed to have written the original screenplay, which then was revised by Kurtzman, but never worked with Ackerman.

In addition to the famous monsters seen in the film, Mad Monster Party? also features several celebrity likenesses. Karloff and Diller's characters are both designed to look like the actors portraying them, while Baron Frankenstein's lackey, Yetch, is a physical and vocal caricature of Peter Lorre. Swift also performs impersonations when voicing his characters, such as James Stewart when voicing Felix, Sydney Greenstreet as the Invisible Man and Charles Laughton as the Freighter Captain.

Mad Monster Party? was one of several family-friendly projects Karloff lent his voice to in his final years (including the 1966 television adaptation of How the Grinch Stole Christmas!). It was his final involvement in a production connected to the Frankenstein mythos that had propelled him to stardom some three decades earlier.

Music

Although the opening credits identify Ethel Ennis as singing the opening theme song and, in the same frame, a soundtrack being available on RCA Victor, a commercially released soundtrack was never produced in any format. In September 1998, Percepto released the mono RCA recording on CD. Waxworks Records released it on vinyl on October 12, 2016.

Reception
The film holds a 70% approval rating on Rotten Tomatoes based on ten reviews. Howard Thompson of The New York Times wrote that "this party should make everybody chuckle".

Home media
The film has been available on video for years, first on original distributor Embassy Pictures' home entertainment unit, and then on other independent labels before StudioCanal acquired some rights to the film. Currently, Lionsgate distributes the film on video under license from StudioCanal.

Before Lionsgate's current video release of Mad Monster Party?, almost all video releases have been from 16 mm film and were of very poor color quality. The original film negative was water-damaged some years ago, but Sony Pictures Television (which now holds the television rights) eventually unearthed an original 35 mm pristine print. This print was digitally remastered, and is the source for the current DVD issue and all subsequent television showings. Anchor Bay released the previous DVD on August 19, 2003, then re-released it on August 23, 2005 with additional features. On September 8, 2009, it was released as a "Special Edition" DVD by Lionsgate. The special features include a documentary including interviews with Rick Goldschmidt, Arthur Rankin Jr., voice artist Allen Swift, storyboard artist Don Duga, musical director Maury Laws and others. The film was released on Blu-ray on September 4, 2012.

Comic book adaptation
 Dell Movie Classic: Mad Monster Party (September 1967)

Related film
Rankin/Bass produced a related TV special called Mad, Mad, Mad Monsters from The ABC Saturday Superstar Movie series, which aired on September 23, 1972. This Halloween special featured many of the same monster characters. Bob McFadden did his imitation of Karloff when voicing Baron Henry von Frankenstein (who resembles Baron Boris von Frankenstein). The animation for the special is provided by Osamu Tezuka's Mushi Production with supervision by Steve Nakagawa, who was also known for his work with Iwao Takamoto at Hanna-Barbera Studios.

See also
 Boris Karloff filmography
 Hotel Transylvania

References

External links

 
 
 
 
 Rankin-Bass Mad Monster Party site

1967 films
1967 animated films
1960s American animated films
1967 musical comedy films
1960s science fiction comedy films
American animated fantasy films
American science fiction comedy films
American vampire films
1960s English-language films
American crossover films
Dracula films
Films set in the Caribbean
Films set on islands
Frankenstein films
1960s monster movies
Mummy films
1960s stop-motion animated films
American werewolf films
Films scored by Maury Laws
Films with screenplays by Arthur Rankin Jr.
Television shows directed by Jules Bass
Rankin/Bass Productions films
American musical comedy films
Films adapted into comics
Vampire comedy films
Vampires in animated film